Johann Lantz or Lanz (1564 – 20 September 1638) was a German mathematician and Jesuit.

Biography 
Born in Tettnang on Lake Constance in 1564, he was admitted as novice in Landsberg in 1589.
He became a professor of Hebrew at the University of Ingolstadt. After 1609-1610 he left his place to his pupil Christoph Scheiner and moved to the University of Munich. He died in Munich in 1638.

He wrote several works on mathematics. He analyzed the four genres of numbers, then the astronomic fractions. He is remembered also by Mario Bettini in his Aerarium philosophiae mathematicae (1648).

Works

References 

17th-century German mathematicians
1638 deaths
1564 births
17th-century German Jesuits
Jesuit scientists